The Kiribati National Paralympic Committee is the National Paralympic Committee representing Kiribati. The organization became full members of the International Paralympic Committee in October 2019. Kiribati was supposed to make their debut at the Summer Paralympics in the 2020 edition in Tokyo. However the country withdrew due to travel restrictions caused by the COVID-19 pandemic.

References

Kiribati
Kiribati at the Paralympics
Paralympic